The Bernard H.V.220 was a 1930s French racing seaplane and the last attempt by Bernard compete in the Schneider Trophy race. Delays caused by engine problems meant the aircraft was abandoned and never flown.

Design and development
The H.V.220 was an all-metal single-seat cantilever monoplane with twin floats and powered by a  Lorraine 12Rcr Radium inline piston engine. 
The aircraft was completed but problems with the Radium engine were never sorted and the aircraft was not flown ending French hopes of a Schneider Trophy win. An improved variant powered by a Radium engine was planned as the H.V.320 but never built.

Specifications (H.V.220)

References

Notes

Bibliography

1930s French sport aircraft
Floatplanes
Single-engined tractor aircraft
HV220
Low-wing aircraft